Pluto's Party is a 1952 cartoon in the Mickey Mouse series, produced by Walt Disney Productions and released by RKO Radio Pictures on September 19, 1952. It was the 124th short in the Mickey Mouse film series to be released, and the first for that year.

Plot
It's Pluto's birthday and Mickey Mouse is busy preparing the party things for his birthday dog. First, Pluto tries to eat the cake, but is caught by his master, when it is time for his bath. As soon as Pluto is looking more neat and tidy, he tries to eat the cake but then gets spotted by his master again. Then, Mickey's nephews barge the gate down and trample all over Pluto as they hurry to the party. The children give Pluto a small red wagon and treat him like a workhorse. They then all start to enjoy themselves at the party. They first take Pluto on the slide, then barge down the swing. Then, they play pin the tail on Pluto to see who can pin Pluto's tail. Soon it is time for lunch and Pluto wants to have a piece of his own cake, but Mickey's nephews prefer to amuse themselves by grabbing every slice of cake and eating it up, much to Pluto's horror. Eventually, they devour Pluto's birthday cake and leave. Pluto, upset that he didn't get any cake, angrily throws a tantrum, knocking away all the dishes until Mickey passes him the last slice of the birthday cake he saved. Pluto happily eats the cake, licking Mickey between bites to show his gratitude.

Voice cast
 Pluto: Pinto Colvig
 Mickey Mouse: Jimmy MacDonald
 Mickey's Nephews: Ruth Clifford

Home media
The short was released on May 18, 2004, on Walt Disney Treasures: Mickey Mouse in Living Color, Volume Two: 1939-Today.

See also

Mickey Mouse (film series)

References

External links

1952 short films
1952 animated films
Mickey Mouse short films
Pluto (Disney) short films
1950s Disney animated short films
Films about birthdays
Films produced by Walt Disney
Films scored by Oliver Wallace
RKO Pictures animated short films
1950s English-language films
American animated short films
RKO Pictures short films
Animated films about mice
Animated films about dogs